Raoul Lefèvre was the 15th-century French author of a Histoire de Jason (in 1460) and the Recoeil des histoires de Troyes (in 1464). Both books were translated and printed by William Caxton, and the latter, as Recuyell of the Historyes of Troye, was the first book printed in English in 1473-1474. Lefèvre was the chaplain of Philip the Good, the creator of the Order of the Golden Fleece, which was based on the classical Jason story.

The Histoire de Jason is known from 20 manuscripts and 30 different printed editions, and was translated in English in 1477 by William Caxton, and in Dutch in 1485.

Notes

External links
 Illustrations of some manuscripts of the Recoeil des histoires de Troyes in the Warburg Institute Iconographic Database
The recuyles or gaderige to gyder of ye hystoryes of Troye From the Rare Book and Special Collections Division at the Library of Congress

15th-century French Roman Catholic priests
Year of birth missing
Year of death missing
15th-century French writers
Arts in the court of Philip the Good
French male writers